The 2017–18 Mid-American Conference men's basketball season began with practices in October 2017, followed by the start of the 2017–18 NCAA Division I men's basketball season in November. Conference play began in January 2018 and concluded in March 2018. Buffalo won the regular season title with a conference record of 15-3. Buffalo also won the MAC tournament and represented the MAC in the NCAA tournament where they defeated No. 4-seeded Arizona in the first round before falling to Kentucky in the second round.

Preseason awards
The preseason poll and league awards were announced by the league office on October 26, 2017.

Preseason men's basketball poll
(First place votes in parenthesis)

East Division
 Buffalo 166 (24)
 Kent State 139 (2)
 Ohio 127 (3)
 Akron 84 (1)
 Bowling Green 82
 Miami 32

West Division
 Western Michigan 169 (22)
 Ball State 156 (8)
 Toledo 107
 Eastern Michigan 103
 Northern Illinois 57
 Central Michigan 38

Tournament champs
Western Michigan (10), Buffalo (9), Ball State (5), Kent State (2), Toledo (2), Bowling Green (1), Miami (1)

Honors

Postseason

Mid–American tournament

NCAA tournament

Postseason awards

Coach of the Year: Nate Oats, Buffalo
Player of the Year: Tre’Shaun Fletcher, Toledo
Freshman of the Year: Nike Sibande, Miami
Defensive Player of the Year: Tim Bond, Eastern Michigan
Sixth Man of the Year: Nick Perkins, Buffalo

Honors

See also
2017–18 Mid-American Conference women's basketball season

References